Nicky Epstein is a knitting designer and author of numerous books on knitting.  She is known for her creative combinations of knitting stitches, and for the colorful patterns often found in her sweaters, especially involving applique of separately knitted motifs.  In 2005, she was given a prestigious award by the National NeedleArts Association.  In 2006, her work was featured in a retrospective fashion show at the Museum of Arts and Design in New York City.  Since the (winter) Holiday 2005 issue, Epstein has written a regular column in Vogue Knitting called simply "Nicky Epstein".

Early life

Nicoletta Quinones was born into an Italian/Spanish family and grew up in a mining town in West Virginia.  Her Italian grandmother taught her to knit, and she completed her first sweater in seventh grade with the guidance of her home economics teacher.  Epstein's mastery of knitting techniques began, however, when she was fourteen, with lessons from a local Spanish woman.

In 1970, Epstein enrolled at the Columbus College of Art and Design to study fashion design, but switched to retail sales and fine art.  She continued to knit in college and earned money for tuition by selling oil paintings.

In 1979, she was art director at a design firm when she entered a McCall's Needlework design contest with a unicorn sweater and won first prize.  Since the early 1980s, Epstein has published many knitting designs, sometimes over fifty a year.

She is married to Howard Epstein and lives in New York City.

Contributions to knitting

Epstein has long been respected as a knitter and designer, and has been quoted as saying, "I will support anything that promotes knitting."  Since 1999, she has published a series of technical books on knitting, focusing on applique ornaments and borders of knitted garments, which are renowned for their creativity.  More recently, she has begun to explore other areas of knitting, such as felting.  Epstein has also authored popular books on making knitted or crocheted clothes for Barbie dolls, as well as sundry projects for the home, such as afghan blankets and Christmas stockings.

References

Bibliography

External links
 Website
 Show at the Museum of Arts and Design

Living people
People in knitting
Columbus College of Art and Design alumni
Year of birth missing (living people)